The Kevin Lowe Trophy (Trophée Kevin Lowe) is awarded annually to the player in the QMJHL judged to be the best defensive defenceman. The winner is determined by the number of bodychecks, plus-minus differential, the player's role within the team, and the number of scoring opportunities. The award is named after Kevin Lowe, an alumnus of the Quebec Remparts and a seven-time NHL all-star defenseman, and a six-time Stanley Cup winner for the Edmonton Oilers and New York Rangers.

Winners

External links
 QMJHL official site List of trophy winners.

Quebec Major Junior Hockey League trophies and awards